Roger Charles André Henri Blaizot (17 May 1891 – 21 March 1981) was a French military leader, who commanded French forces during World War II and the First Indochina War. Blaizot served in Indochina through the last two years of the World War II, having been sent to command the Far East French Expeditionary Forces (Forces Francaises Extrême Orient) by Charles de Gaulle. Following the war, Blaizot led a fifty-member staff group to Indochina as part of a cooperation between British Special Operations Executive agents of Force 136 and the French government to ensure French retention of South East Asia, this having been approved by Lord Philip Mountbatten in 1943. Blaizot then went on to command the French forces in Indochina from 1948 until 1949, succeeding Jean-Étienne Valluy and being succeeded himself by Marcel Carpentier.

See also
 Far East French Expeditionary Forces
 C.L.I.

Notes

References

Printed sources:

 Bodinier, Gilbert, La Guerre d'Indochine, 1945-1954: textes et documents, France Armée de terre, service historique, 1987.
 Chapuis, Oscar. The Last Emperors of Vietnam: From Tu Duc to Bao Dai, Greenwood Publishing Group, 2000. 
 Currey, Cecil B. Victory at Any Cost: The Genius of Viet Nam's Gen. Vo Nguyen Giap Potomac Books Inc. 2005. 
 Duiker, William J. U.S. Containment Policy and the Conflict in Indochina, Stanford University Press, 1994. 
 Lawrence, Mark Atwood and Fredrik Logevall, The First Vietnam War: Colonial Conflict and Cold War Crisis, Harvard University Press, 2007. 
 Thomas, Martin, Silent Partners: SOE's French Indo-China Section, 1943-1945, Modern Asian Studies, p. 943–976, Cambridge University Press, 2000.
 Tucker, Spencer C. Vietnam, Routledge, 1999. 

Websites:
 Biography of: Blaizot, Roger-Charles-André-Henri, Lieutenant-General. (1895 – 1981)

1890s births
1981 deaths
French generals
French military personnel of World War II
French military personnel of the First Indochina War